Thomas Patrick Tumulty (born February 11, 1973) is a former professional American football player who played linebacker for three seasons for the Cincinnati Bengals.

1973 births
Living people
People from Penn Hills Township, Allegheny County, Pennsylvania
Players of American football from Pennsylvania
American football linebackers
Pittsburgh Panthers football players
Cincinnati Bengals players
Ed Block Courage Award recipients